Canens is a commune in the Haute-Garonne department in southwestern France.

Geography
The commune is bordered by five other communes, four of them is in Haute-Garonne, and one of them is in Ariège: Castagnac to the north, Bax to the west, Latrape to the northwest, Lapeyrère to the southwest, Massabrac to the east, and finally by the department of Ariège to the south by the commune of Sainte-Suzanne to the south.

Population

See also
Communes of the Haute-Garonne department

References

Communes of Haute-Garonne